"Bang a Drum" is a country rock song written and originally performed by Jon Bon Jovi. Released in 1990, it featured on Jon Bon Jovi's Blaze of Glory album, which had songs that were inspired by the 1990 film sequel Young Guns II, and some songs directly from the film.

Country version
In 1998, country singer Chris LeDoux covered "Bang a Drum", with Jon Bon Jovi performing guest vocals. The guitar solo was performed by guitar virtuoso Shawn Lane.  It was featured on LeDoux's One Road Man album, produced by Trey Bruce and reached number 68 on the US Hot Country Songs. This version also features a music video.

Charts

Chris LeDoux version 
The song debuted at number 74 on the U.S. Billboard Hot Country Songs for the week of October 3, 1998.

References

1990 songs
1998 singles
Chris LeDoux songs
Jon Bon Jovi songs
Songs written by Jon Bon Jovi
Capitol Records Nashville singles
Song recordings produced by Danny Kortchmar